Arianna in Nasso is a 1733 opera by Nicola Porpora to a libretto by Paolo Rolli, chief conductor of the Opera of the Nobility.

Background
The choice of the subject of Ariadne was a challenge to Handel, whose Arianna in Creta was completed by 5 October 1733. Handel's Arianna in Creta was based on Pietro Pariati's much-set Arianna e Teseo, in the later of two versions by Leonardo Leo (1729). This was a libretto which Porpora himself had also used for his own Arianna e Teseo (1721). Handel's choice of libretto obliged Porpora to turn to Rolli's libretto which was modeled not on Pariati but on Stampa's libretto to Giovanni Porta's dramma pastorale, Arianna.

Musical numbers

Act 1
 Overture
 Allegro
Scene 1: Ahi! Che langue oppresso il core (Arianna)
Scene 1: L'un minaccia, l'altra alletta (Arianna)
Scene 1: Ahi! Che langue (Arianna)
Scene 2: Cadete a colpi d'Ateniese braccio (Teseo)
Scene 2: Aria: Ho vinto, ma non gia (Teseo)
Scene 3: Figlio d'Ixion, Re dei Lapiti (Piritoo)
Scene 3: Aria: Piu l'impresa perigli n'appresta (Piritoo)
Scene 4: Ecco la piu opportuna aita (Onaro)
Scene 4: Aria: Orgogliose procellose (Onaro)
Scene 5: So che il tuo sol valor (Piritoo)
Scene 5: Aria: Pensat'a vendicar (Antiope)
Scene 6: Grazie a te dello scampo (Teseo)
Scene 6: Aria: Nume che reggi il mare (Teseo)
Scene 7: Il tuo dolce mormorio (Arianna)
Scene 7: Recitative: Lieto ritorno all'alma mia (Teseo)
Scene 7: Aria: D'aura gioconda (Onaro)
Scene 7: Recitative dopa l'aria: Di dolcissimi affetti (Teseo)
Scene 7: Duet: In amoroso petto (Arianna, Teseo)
Act 2
Scene 1: Cotesto e il padiglion (Antiope)
Scene 1: Aria: Gia lo so (Antiope)
Scene 2: Misera! Che ascoltai (Arianna)
Scene 2: Aria: Va', mancator di fe (Arianna)
Scene 3: Egli e desso (Piritoo)
Scene 3: Aria: Giurasti fede (Antiope)
Scene 3: Aria: A contesa di due belle (Piritoo)
Scene 4: Ragione e onor vogliono (Arianna)
Scene 4: Aria: Un altro oggetto puo (Teseo)
Scene 4: Recitative: Agitata alma mia (Arianna)
Scene 4: Aria: Miseri sventurati (Arianna)
Scene 6: Onaro qui venir m'impose (Teseo)
Scene 6: Recitative: Teseo, gia tutte a scolorir le cose (Nume Libero)
Scene 6: Aria: Numi, vi cedo (Teseo)
Act 3
Scene 1: Gran nume Semeleo (Arianna)
Scene 1: Aria: Rendera l'amore all'alma (Onaro)
Scene 2: Si, me ne andro ramingo (Teseo)
Scene 2: Aria: Vivere senza te (Antiope)
Scene 3: Vien fido amico (Teseo)
Scene 3: Aria: Altro da te non bramo (Teseo)
Scene 3: Aria: Fra nuove imprese (Piritoo)
Scene 4: Io son la sola (Arianna)
Scene 4: Duet: Vieni, parti (Antiope, Teseo)
Scene 5: Si, caro ti consola (Arianna)
Scene 5: Aria: Celeste forza (Arianna)
Scene 5: Evoe, Evoe (Coribanti, Baccanti)

References

External links
 

Operas
1733 operas
Operas by Nicola Porpora
Italian-language operas
Ariadne
Operas based on classical mythology